Ahmed Ali Lahori (1887 – 23 February 1962) was a Pakistani Sunni Muslim scholar and Quran interpreter.
His students include Abul Hasan Ali Nadwi.

Early life and career
Ahmed Ali Lahori was a student of Ubaidullah Sindhi. He studied Islamic studies and graduated in 1927. Ahmed Ali Lahori was employed as a lecturer at his teacher's institute and also married his teacher's daughter. He also helped him in organizing new groups. However, Ubaidullah Sindhi died in 1944 before the 1947 partition of India. So Maulana Shabbir Ahmad Usmani led a group of Deobandi scholars including Ahmed Ali Lahori to support the demand for Pakistan movement and Muhammad Ali Jinnah. Therefore, this whole group came over to newly created Pakistan in 1947 and settled here.

Death and survivors
Ahmed Ali Lahori died in Lahore on 23 February 1962 and was buried in Miani Saheb Graveyard. His son Ubaidullah Anwar was an Islamic scholar.

See also
 Ubaidullah Sindhi
 Rashid Ahmad Gangohi
 Shabbir Ahmad Usmani
 Ashraf Ali Thanwi
 Tariq Jameel

References

External links
کھوکھر, محمد اسلم
 
Read Maulana Ahmed Ali Lahori's Translation of Quran-e-Aziz ONLINE(currently shown is translation in English. If desired, choose URDU from Translation on the Right-Top of the Opened Window)
Read  Muslims in India since 1947: Islamic Perspectives on Inter-Faith Relations for a detailed account of the Role of True Freedom Fighters in the Indian Subcontinent
https://islamicbookslibrary.wordpress.com/2014/05/22/maulana-ahmad-ali-lahori-r-a-ke-hairat-angaiz-waqiat-by-shaykh-hakim-ali/ A book on the amazing events in the life of Ahmed Ali Lahori

1887 births
1962 deaths
Pakistani Sufis
Pakistani Sunni Muslim scholars of Islam
People from Lahore
People from British India
Pakistani Islamic religious leaders
Deobandis
Pakistan Movement activists